The Fifteenth Amendment may refer to the:

Fifteenth Amendment to the United States Constitution, which guaranteed men the right to vote regardless of race
Fifteenth Amendment of the Constitution of Ireland, which allowed divorce to be legalized in Ireland. 
Fifteenth Amendment to the Constitution of Pakistan, which sought to impose Sharia Law but was not passed.
Fifteenth Amendment of the Constitution of South Africa repealed some of the provisions inserted into the Constitution by the Eighth and Tenth Amendments which allowed for floor-crossing, that is, allowed members of legislative bodies to move from one political party to another without losing their seats.